Anacampsis is a worldwide genus of moth with most found in the nearctic and neotropical regions. It is in the family Gelechiidae. The larvae feed on a range of deciduous trees and shrubs in a rolled or folded leaf, or spun shoot.

Species

Anacampsis aedificata Meyrick, 1929
Anacampsis agrimoniella (Clemens, 1860)
Anacampsis anisogramma (Meyrick, 1927)
Anacampsis argyrothamniella Busck, 1900
Anacampsis blattariella (Hubner, 1796)
Anacampsis capyrodes Meyrick, 1922
Anacampsis cenelpis (Walsingham, 1911)
Anacampsis chlorodecta (Meyrick, 1932)
Anacampsis comparanda (Meyrick, 1929)
Anacampsis conclusella (Walker, 1864)
Anacampsis conistica Walsingham, 1910
Anacampsis considerata Meyrick, 1922
Anacampsis consonella (Zeller, 1873)
Anacampsis cornifer Walsingham, 1897
Anacampsis cosmia Meyrick, 1921
Anacampsis coverdalella Kearfott, 1903
Anacampsis crypticopa (Meyrick, 1931)
Anacampsis diplodelta Meyrick, 1922
Anacampsis embrocha Meyrick, 1914
Anacampsis flexiloqua Meyrick, 1922
Anacampsis fragariella Busck, 1904
Anacampsis fullonella (Zeller, 1873)
Anacampsis fuscella (Eversmann, 1844)
Anacampsis hirsutella (Constant, 1885)
Anacampsis homoplasta (Meyrick, 1932)
Anacampsis humilis Hodges, 1970
Anacampsis idiocentra Meyrick, 1922
Anacampsis innocuella (Zeller, 1873)
Anacampsis inquieta (Meyrick, 1914)
Anacampsis insularis Walsingham, 1897
Anacampsis kearfottella (Busck, 1903)
Anacampsis lacteusochrella (Chambers, 1875)
Anacampsis lagunculariella Busck, 1900
Anacampsis languens Meyrick, 1918
Anacampsis lapidella Walsingham, 1897
Anacampsis levipedella (Clemens, 1863)
Anacampsis lignaria (Meyrick, 1926)
Anacampsis lithodelta Meyrick, 1922
Anacampsis lupinella Busck, 1901
Anacampsis maculatella (Lucas, 1956)
Anacampsis malella Amsel, 1959
Anacampsis meibomiella Forbes, 1931
Anacampsis mongolicae Park, 1988
Anacampsis multinotata (Meyrick, 1918)
Anacampsis niveopulvella (Chambers, 1875)
Anacampsis nocturna (Meyrick, 1914)
Anacampsis nonstrigella Busck, 1906
Anacampsis obscurella (Denis & Schiffermuller, 1775)
Anacampsis okui Park, 1988
Anacampsis paltodoriella Busck, 1903
Anacampsis panormitella (Caradja, 1920)
Anacampsis peloptila (Meyrick, 1914)
Anacampsis perquisita Meyrick, 1922
Anacampsis petrographa Meyrick, 1922
Anacampsis phytomiella Busck, 1914
Anacampsis poliombra Meyrick, 1922
Anacampsis pomaceella (Walker, 1864)
Anacampsis populella (Clerck, 1759)
Anacampsis prasina (Meyrick, 1914)
Anacampsis primigenia Meyrick, 1918
Anacampsis psoraliella Barnes & Busck, 1920
Anacampsis quinquepunctella Walsingham, 1897
Anacampsis rhabdodes Walsingham, 1910
Anacampsis rhoifructella (Clemens, 1861)
Anacampsis rivalis Meyrick, 1918
Anacampsis sacramenta Keifer, 1933
Anacampsis scalata (Meyrick, 1914)
Anacampsis scintillella (Fischer von Röslerstamm, 1841)
Anacampsis solemnella (Christoph, 1882)
Anacampsis subactella (Walker, 1864)
Anacampsis temerella (Lienig & Zeller, 1846)
Anacampsis tephriasella (Chambers, 1872)
Anacampsis timidella (Wocke, 1887)
Anacampsis triangularis Braun, 1923
Anacampsis triangulella Park, 1988
Anacampsis tridentella (Walsingham, 1910)
Anacampsis trifoliella (Constant, 1890)
Anacampsis tristrigella (Walsingham, 1882)
Anacampsis ursula Walsingham, 1910
Anacampsis viretella (Zeller, 1877)
Anacampsis wikeri Harrison, 2013

Status unclear
Anacampsis hamartola Walsingham
Anacampsis karmeliella Amsel, 1935

Former species
Anacampsis parviocellatella Bruand, 1850

References

External links

  1988: Systematic study of on the genus Anacampsis (Lepidoptera, Gelechiidae) in Japan and Korea. Tinea, 12: 135–155.
images representing  Anacampsis at Consortium for the Barcode of Life

 
Anacampsini
Moth genera